The Gaogou Formation is a fossiliferous geological formation located in the Xixia Basin of China. The formation dates back to the Late Cretaceous (Cenomanian-Coniacian) and fossilized eggs of dinosaurs and turtles are commonly reported from the formation. Dinosaur taxa is also reported from the unit.

Paleobiota of the Gaogou Formation

Dinosaurs

Eggs

Flora

Invertebrates

Turtles

See also 

 List of dinosaur-bearing rock formations
 List of stratigraphic units with dinosaur trace fossils
 Dinosaur eggs
 Cenomanian-Turonian extinction event

References 

Geologic formations of China
Upper Cretaceous Series of Asia
Cretaceous China
Cenomanian Stage
Turonian Stage
Conglomerate formations
Mudstone formations
Fluvial deposits
Ooliferous formations
Paleontology in Henan